Maya & Marty is an American television variety show that premiered on NBC on May 31, 2016. The series was co-hosted by comedians Maya Rudolph and Martin Short, and produced by Lorne Michaels. The show features various comedy sketches, musical performances, and celebrity guests.  Kenan Thompson was also a regular, as was Mikey Day.  Though not listed as a series regular, Steve Martin appeared in three of the show's six episodes; Jimmy Fallon and Sean Hayes each appeared in two episodes.

Production 

Rudolph had previously hosted a variety show titled The Maya Rudolph Show, with a standalone pilot aired on May 19, 2014. In its original form it was not initially picked up for series. Beginning in 2015, the concept was revived and went through approximately one year's worth of redevelopment. The variety series was greenlit on February 12, 2016, and was tentatively titled Maya and Marty in Manhattan. The variety series was recorded at Studio 6A in NBC's headquarters at 30 Rockefeller Plaza in New York City. Saturday Night Live is broadcast from the same building, of which both Short and Rudolph are alumni.

The series is the network's second recent attempt at airing a prime time variety show after Best Time Ever with Neil Patrick Harris was cancelled partway through the late 2015 season.

Broadcast 
Maya & Marty premiered on NBC in the United States.  The first episode aired at 10:00/9:00 pm ET/PT on Tuesday, May 31, 2016, following the 11th season premiere of America's Got Talent. The season finale of the first season aired at 10:00/9:00 pm ET/PT on Tuesday, July 12, 2016.

Cast 
Starring
 Maya Rudolph
 Martin Short
 Kenan Thompson

Featuring
 Mikey Day

Guest appearances
The first season of Maya & Marty featured guest appearances by Jimmy Fallon, Larry David, Tom Hanks, Steve Martin, Kate McKinnon, Savion Glover, Miley Cyrus, Drake, Sean Hayes, Nathan Lane, Tina Fey, John Cena, Nick Jonas, Eva Longoria, Kevin Hart, Ben Stiller, Ana Gasteyer, Ricky Gervais, Jerry Seinfeld, Kevin Kline, Cecily Strong, Amy Poehler, Will Forte, Kelly Ripa, and Emma Stone.

Episodes

References

External links 
 
 

2010s American sketch comedy television series
2016 American television series debuts
2016 American television series endings
NBC original programming
English-language television shows
Television series by Broadway Video
Television series by 3 Arts Entertainment
Television series by Universal Television
2010s American variety television series
American live television series